Tillandsia violascens is a species of flowering plant in the genus Tillandsia. This species is native to Bolivia.

References

violascens
Flora of Bolivia